Yousef Al-Dokhi is a Kuwaiti football defender who played for Kuwait in the 1996 Asian Cup. He also played for Kazma and competed in the men's tournament at the 1992 Summer Olympics.

References

External links

1973 births
Living people
Kuwaiti footballers
Place of birth missing (living people)
Association football defenders
Olympic footballers of Kuwait
Footballers at the 1992 Summer Olympics
Asian Games bronze medalists for Kuwait
Asian Games medalists in football
Footballers at the 1994 Asian Games
Medalists at the 1994 Asian Games
Kuwait Premier League players
Kazma SC players
Kuwait international footballers
1996 AFC Asian Cup players